Venezuela competed at the 2020 Summer Paralympics in Tokyo, Japan, from 24 August to 5 September 2021.

Medalists

Athletics 

Five Venezuela athlete (Luis Felipe Rodriguez Bolivar, Edwars Alexander Varela Mesa, Lisbeli Marina Vera Andrade, Greilyz G. Villarroel Hernandez & Naibys Daniela Morillo Gil successfully to break through the qualifications for the 2020 Paralympics after breaking the qualification limit.

DQ: Disqualified | SB: Season Best | Q: Qualified by place or standard based on overall position after heats | DNM: Did not mark | DNA: Did not advance | N/A: Not available, stage was not contested | PB: Personal Best | WR: World Record | PR: Paralympic Record | AR: Area Record

 Men's track

 Men's field

 Women's track

 Women's field

Cycling 

Venezuela sent one male cyclist after successfully getting a slot in the 2018 UCI Nations Ranking Allocation quota for the Americas.

Judo

Powerlifting 

DNM: Did not mark

Swimming 

One Venezuela swimmer has successfully entered the paralympic slot after breaking the MQS.

Table tennis

Venezuela entered one athletes into the table tennis competition at the games. Denisos Martinez qualified from 2019 Parapan American Games which was held in Lima, Peru.

Men

References 

Nations at the 2020 Summer Paralympics
2020
2020 in Venezuelan sport